

Group 6 

All times are local

6